Coronelsuchus is an extinct genus of sphagesaurian crocodylomorph known from the Late Cretaceous Araçatuba Formation of Brazil. It contains a single species, Coronelsuchus civali.

References 

Notosuchians
Prehistoric pseudosuchian genera
Terrestrial crocodylomorphs
Late Cretaceous crocodylomorphs of South America
Cretaceous Brazil
Fossils of Brazil
Fossil taxa described in 2021